Grafton is a village in the Harrogate district of North Yorkshire, England. The village is joined with Marton and forms the civil parish of Marton cum Grafton.

Grafton was first mentioned in the Domesday Book in 1086.  The toponym is from the Old English grāf and tūn, meaning "farmstead in the wood".

References

External links

Villages in North Yorkshire
Borough of Harrogate